The Palestro-class were four destroyers of the Italian Regia Marina that saw service from the mid-1920s to World War II.

The ships were designed in 1915 and based on the Audace-class destroyer. Eight ships were ordered, but because of wartime shortages of materials only four were eventually completed. These four ships were laid down in 1917 at the Orlando shipyard in Livorno, but were not finally completed until 1921–1923. In 1938 they were re-rated as torpedo boats.

The design was subsequently enlarged into the s, a design that was developed into a series of medium-sized Italian destroyer classes.

Ships
 Palestro (PT) was laid down in April 1917, launched on 23 March 1919 and completed in January 1921.
 Confienza (CF) was laid down in May 1917, launched on 18 December 1920 and completed in April 1923. She sank after a collision with auxiliary cruiser Capitano A. Cecchi off Brindisi on 20 November 1940.
 San Martino (SM) was laid down in April 1917, launched on 8 September 1920 and completed in October 1922. She was captured by the Germans at Piraeus, Greece, on 9 September 1943, and was commissioned into the Kriegsmarine on 28 October 1943 as TA17. She was mined on 18 June 1944, and bombed on 18 September 1944 while under repair. She was finally scuttled at Salamis on 12 October 1944.
 Solferino (SL)  was laid down in April 1917, launched on 28 April 1920 and completed in October 1921. She was captured by the Germans at Souda, Crete, on 9 September 1943, and was commissioned into the Kriegsmarine on 25 July 1944 as TA18.

See also
 List of Italian destroyers
 Torpedoboot Ausland

References

Bibliography

External links
 Classe Palestro Marina Militare website

 
Destroyers of the Regia Marina
Destroyer classes